Sodium metavanadate is the inorganic compound with the formula NaVO3. It is a yellow, water-soluble salt.

Sodium metavanadate is a common precursor to other vanadates. At low pH it converts to sodium decavanadate.  It is also precursor to exotic metalates such as [γ-PV2W10O40]5-, [α-PVW11O40]4-, and [β-PV2W10O40]5-.

Minerals
Sodium metavanadate occurs as two minor minerals, metamunirite (anhydrous) and a dihydrate, munirite. Both are very rare, metamunirite is now known only from vanadium- and uranium-bearing sandstone formations of central-western USA and munirite from Pakistan and South Africa.

References 

Vanadates
Sodium compounds